Brad Dunwell (born December 31, 1996) is an American soccer player who currently plays for USL League One side Charlotte Independence.

Career

Youth and college 
Dunwell played four years of college soccer at Wake Forest University between 2015 and 2018, starting in all 91 games, scoring a single goal and tallying 14 assists. Led the Deacs to a 73-11-7 record in his four seasons, more wins than any other Division I program in that time. Dunwell received All-ACC athletic and academic honors every season along with United Soccer Coaches All-America Second Team in 2018. 

While at college, Dunwell appeared for USL Premier Development League side Michigan Bucks between 2015 and 2018. The Bucks finished first in the Great Lakes conference in 2015, 2016, and 2017. Dunwell won a PDL Championship with the Bucks in 2016 with a 16-2-0 record.

Professional 
On January 14, 2019, Dunwell was selected 56th overall in the 2019 MLS SuperDraft by Houston Dynamo. On March 8, 2019, Dunwell signed for Houston's USL Championship affiliate side Rio Grande Valley FC. Dunwell was released by the Toros at the end of the season.

On January 10, 2020, Dunwell signed with USL Championship side Oklahoma City Energy. Energy FC announced they would be suspending play for the 2022 USL Championship season.

On January 21, 2022, Dunwell signed with Detroit City ahead of their inaugural USL Championship season. He left Detroit following their 2022 season.

Dunwell signed with USL League One side Charlotte Independence on February 21, 2023.

References

External links 
 Brad Dunwell - Men's Soccer Wake Forest bio
 

1996 births
Living people
American soccer players
Association football midfielders
Houston Dynamo FC draft picks
Flint City Bucks players
Rio Grande Valley FC Toros players
OKC Energy FC players
Detroit City FC players
Charlotte Independence players
Soccer players from Michigan
Sportspeople from Grand Rapids, Michigan
USL Championship players
USL League Two players
Wake Forest Demon Deacons men's soccer players